Derive was a computer algebra system, developed as a successor to muMATH by the Soft Warehouse in Honolulu, Hawaii, now owned by Texas Instruments. The first release was in 1988 for DOS. It was discontinued on June 29, 2007 in favor of the TI-Nspire CAS. The last and final version is Derive 6.1 for Windows.

Since Derive required comparably little memory, it was suitable for use on older and smaller machines. It was available for the DOS and Windows platforms and was used also in TI pocket calculators.

Books 
 
 Jerry Glynn, Exploring Math from Algebra to Calculus with Derive, A Mathematical Assistant, Mathware Inc, 1992, 
 Leon Magiera, General Physics Problem Solving With Cas Derive, Nova Science Pub Inc 2001, 
 Vladimir Dyakonov. Handbook on application system Derive. Moscow (Russia) 1996, Phismatlit, 320 p, 
 Vladimir Dyakonov. Computers algebra systems Derive. Moscow (Russia) 2002, SOLON-R, 320 p,

See also 
 List of computer algebra systems

External links 
 Derive Review at scientific-computing.com 
 Derive Newsletter from the International Derive Users Group

1988 software
Computer algebra systems
Discontinued software
Lisp (programming language) software
Science software for Windows